Eupanacra cadioui is a moth of the  family Sphingidae. It is known from the Philippines.

The length of the forewings is about 28 mm for males and 32 mm for females. It is similar to Eupanacra busiris busiris except for some differences in the patterns on the forewing upperside, which has a pale brown ground colour with various black spots. There are alternating cream, pale brown and dark brown lines found on the upperside of the head, thorax and abdomen. Females are similar to males but somewhat larger and darker

References

Eupanacra
Moths described in 1993